Norway competed at the 2002 Winter Olympics in Salt Lake City, United States. The nation enjoyed its best ever results in gold medals, most notably in the biathlon events, when Ole Einar Bjørndalen swept all four gold medals.

With 13 gold medals, Norway tied the Soviet Union at the 1976 Winter Olympics for most gold medals a country won at a Winter Olympics. However, Canada broke this record with 14 when they hosted the Vancouver games.

Medalists

Alpine skiing

Men

Men's combined

Women

Biathlon

Men

Men's 4 × 7.5 km relay

Women

Women's 4 × 7.5 km relay

 1 A penalty loop of 150 metres had to be skied per missed target. 
 2 Starting delay based on 10 km sprint results. 
 3 One minute added per missed target. 
 4 Starting delay based on 7.5 km sprint results.

Bobsleigh

Men

Cross-country skiing

Men
Sprint

Pursuit

 1 Starting delay based on 10 km C. results. 
 C = Classical style, F = Freestyle

4 × 10 km relay

Women
Sprint

Pursuit

 2 Starting delay based on 5 km C. results. 
 C = Classical style, F = Freestyle

4 × 5 km relay

Curling

Men's tournament

Group stage
Top four teams advanced to semi-finals.

|}

Medal round
Semi-final

Gold medal game

Contestants

Women's tournament

Group stage
Top four teams advanced to semi-finals.

|}

Contestants

Freestyle skiing

Women

Nordic combined 

Men's sprint

Events:
 large hill ski jumping
 7.5 km cross-country skiing 

Men's individual

Events:
 normal hill ski jumping
 15 km cross-country skiing 

Men's Team

Four participants per team.

Events:
 normal hill ski jumping
 5 km cross-country skiing

Skeleton

Men

Ski jumping 

Men's team large hill

 1 Four teams members performed two jumps each.

Snowboarding

Men's halfpipe

Women's halfpipe

Speed skating

Men

Notes

References
 Official Olympic Reports
 International Olympic Committee results database
 Olympic Winter Games 2002, full results by sports-reference.com

Nations at the 2002 Winter Olympics
2002
2002 in Norwegian sport